The Other Side... Demos and Rarities Part II is the third compilation extended play by UK-based pop act Shakespears Sister, released in May 2013 exclusively through the digital store on the act's official website. Like its previously released counterpart, the EP consists of demos, remixes, and previously never-heard unreleased songs.

Track listing

References 

2011 EPs
Shakespears Sister albums